The iPad Mini 3 (stylized and marketed as iPad mini 3) is the third-generation iPad Mini tablet computer designed, developed and marketed by Apple Inc. It was announced alongside the iPad Air 2 on October 16, 2014 and released on October 22. It uses primarily the same design and hardware as that of its predecessor, the iPad Mini 2. Its new features are the addition of the Touch ID sensor compatible with Apple Pay, differing storage sizes and being available in a gold color, as well as the previous colors.

On September 9, 2015, the iPad Mini 3 was discontinued and replaced by the iPad Mini 4.

Features

Software 

The iPad mini 3 comes with the iOS 8.1 operating system preinstalled. It comes with several built-in applications, which are Camera, Photos, Messages, FaceTime, Mail, Music, Safari, Maps, Siri, Calendar, iTunes Store, App Store, Notes, Contacts, iBooks, Game Center, Reminders, Clock, Videos, Newsstand, Photo Booth and Podcasts. The Apple App Store, a digital application distribution platform for iOS, allows users to browse and download applications made by various developers from the iTunes Store. Additional apps made by Apple itself are available for free download, which are iMovie, GarageBand, iTunes U, Find My iPhone, Find My Friends, Apple Store, Trailers, Remote, and the iWork apps (Pages, Keynote, and Numbers).
 Like all iOS devices, the iPad Mini 3 can also sync content and other data with a Mac or PC using iTunes. Although the tablet is not designed to make phone calls over a cellular network, users can use a headset or the built-in speaker and microphone to place phone calls over Wi-Fi or cellular using a VoIP application such as Skype (if hardware supported).

The iPad Mini 3 includes a version of Apple Pay with the built-in NFC functionality removed.

Siri, an intelligent personal assistant and knowledge navigator, is integrated into the device and it can be activated hands-free. The application uses a natural language user interface to answer questions, make recommendations, and perform actions by delegating requests to a set of Web services. Apple claims that the software adapts to the user's individual preferences over time and personalizes results. Additionally, Siri can identify songs by using Shazam to listen to any song playing nearby. Siri then stores a list of any songs it has managed to identify on iTunes.

Facebook and Twitter come integrated through Apple's native apps. Facebook features can be directly accessed from within native apps such as Calendar which can sync Facebook events, or use Facebook's like button from within the Apple App Store. The iPad Mini 3 also got iOS 9-12. The iPad Mini 3 did not get iPadOS 13.

Design 
The iPad Mini 3 uses almost exactly the same design as that of the iPad Mini 2, with the addition of Touch ID. Additionally, with the announcement of iPad Mini 3 and the iPad Air 2, Apple added the gold color option to the existing silver and space gray color choices of iPads.

Hardware 
iPad Mini 3 uses nearly the same hardware as the iPad Mini 2, the main exception being the addition of the Touch ID sensor. It has a 7.9" retina display with 2048-by-1536-pixel resolution at 326 ppi. The iPad Mini 3 also uses the A7 chip with 64-bit architecture and the M7 motion coprocessor. It has a 5MP iSight Camera capable of recording 1080p HD video and a 1.2MP FaceTime HD Camera capable of recording 720p HD video.

The new Touch ID sensor detects the user's fingerprint and can be used instead of a passcode to unlock the iPad. Touch ID on the iPad Mini 3 is also compatible with Apple Pay and can be used to authorize purchases in online apps only with fingerprint verification, as opposed to entering passwords.

The iPad Mini 3 is available with storage options of 16, 64 or 128 GB and has no expansion option. Apple has released a "camera connection kit" with an SD card reader, but it can only be used to transfer photos and videos to an iPad.

Reception 
The iPad Mini 3 received positive reviews but drew fainter praise than its predecessor, as it was identical to the iPad Mini 2 except for the addition of Touch ID and the availability of the gold color. The iPad Mini 2 was regarded as a better buy, being US$100 cheaper and featuring the same screen and internals. While the Mini 2 and 3 were stuck at the same hardware level of the original iPad Air, the iPad Air 2's new hardware was considerably more powerful. Furthermore, the Air 2 was also redesigned lighter and smaller than the original Air, which nullified some of the advantages of the Mini 2 and 3's compact form factor.

Timeline

References

External links 
 – official site

Products introduced in 2014
Products and services discontinued in 2015
Mini
iPad Mini (3)
Tablet computers
Touchscreen portable media players
Tablet computers introduced in 2014